Leonardo "Leo" Ayala (born September 2, 1993) is an American soccer player.

Career

Youth and College
Ayala played four years of college soccer at the University of Central Florida between 2011 and 2014. Leo also played for the Houston Dynamo Academy.

Professional
Ayala signed with United Soccer League side Rio Grande Valley FC Toros on March 26, 2016.

References

External links

UCF Knights bio

1993 births
Living people
American soccer players
Association football forwards
UCF Knights men's soccer players
Rio Grande Valley FC Toros players
Soccer players from Texas
USL Championship players
Association football defenders